Hide and Shriek is a 1938 Our Gang short film directed by Gordon Douglas. It was the 168th Our Gang entry in the series, and the last to involve series creator Hal Roach.

Plot
Opening his own detective agency, Alfalfa dons a deerstalker cap and rechristens himself "X-10, Sooper Sleuth." His first assignment: to find out who stole a box of candy from Darla. Suspecting that Leonard and Junior are the alleged culprits, Alfalfa and his chief (and only) operatives Buckwheat and Porky put a tail on the two youngsters. Unfortunately, the three junior gumshoes are sidetracked to a seaside amusement pier, where they find themselves trapped in a haunted house attraction. Darla eventually discovers her candy was right where she left it- in her doll carriage. But it's too late: scared out of their wits by various ersatz ghosts, monsters and spooky moans and groans, our heroes vow to give up the detective business forever (as Alfalfa's "Out of Bizzness" sign on the door notes).

Cast

The Gang
 Darla Hood as Darla
 Eugene Lee as Porky, alias X-6
 Carl Switzer as Alfalfa, alias X-10
 Billie Thomas as Buckwheat, alias X-6½

Additional cast
 Gary Jasgur as Gary
 Leonard Landy as Percy
 Billy Bletcher as Voices of haunted house ghouls (voice)
 Fred Holmes as Janitor

Notes
Hide and Shriek was the final entry in producer Hal Roach's Our Gang series and the last short film released overall by the studio. Roach was contracted to produce one more year's worth of Our Gang shorts for MGM, but his distribution deal with other properties expired earlier that year. Roach switched to another studio, United Artists, to distribute his feature films. Our Gang was his only remaining short subject series. As a result, MGM opted to purchase the unit outright, as Our Gang was still popular and MGM wanted to keep the series in production.

Upon arrival at MGM, Our Gang would continue in production until 1944. The MGM entires are considered by several critics, and the Our Gang actors themselves, as lesser entries compared to the Roach shorts.

See also
 Our Gang filmography

References

External links

1938 films
1938 comedy films
1938 short films
American black-and-white films
Films directed by Gordon Douglas
Metro-Goldwyn-Mayer short films
Our Gang films
1930s American films